The 3200-series (numbered 3201–3457) is a series of 'L' cars built between 1992 and 1994 by Morrison-Knudsen of Hornell, New York, with body shells built by Brazilian subcontractor Mafersa. A total of 257 cars were built, of which 255 remain in service.

The 3200-series was the last of five series of Chicago "L" cars known as the High Performance Family and the last railcars ordered for the Chicago Transit Authority that use direct current motors. Future train orders are using alternating current motors.

The original order for 256 cars was used for the opening of the Orange Line, which needed new cars when it opened in October 1993.  The order was completed in 1994.
The 3200-series contains many innovations over the previous 2600-series, including solid state computerized (microprocessor) control for much of the cab functions and traction system. Diagnostics are also easier to perform on this series than on previous series. In addition, fluted steel siding is included on these cars for the first time since the 2200-series, in order to reduce graffiti. The series also introduced hopper windows for use in case of air conditioner failure.

Cars 3441-3456 were originally equipped with pantographs for use on the Yellow Line, which was powered by overhead lines until 2004. The pantographs on 3451-3456 were removed in the late 1990s when they were reassigned to supplement the Brown Line, while the rest lost their pantographs when the Yellow Line was converted to third rail power in 2004.

The pair currently runs on the Brown Line, which is currently equipped with both 2600-series and 3200-series cars.

The 3200-series cars are currently assigned to the Blue and Brown Lines. At various points during their service life a small number were also assigned to the Yellow and Purple Lines. In late 2018, some of the 3200-series cars will be reassigned from the Brown and Orange Lines to the Blue Line, with the 2600-series cars from the Blue Line replacing some 3200-series cars from the Orange Line.  These cars entered service on the Blue Line on September 17, 2018, and were removed from service from the Orange Line in October 2018.

Mid-life overhaul
In May 2014, two trainsets (one on the Brown Line and one on the Orange Line) were retrofitted with LED destination signs similar to those on the 5000-series cars as a project for a mid-life overhaul for the cars. The overhaul plans were approved on August 14, 2014. In addition to new LED destination signs, new LED run number boxes, including car 3458 (except cars 3227-28), new air conditioning systems are being installed, and the propulsion systems, passenger door motors, and wheel and axle assemblies were rebuilt. The 3200-series rehabilitation began in 2015 and was completed in 2018. In Summer 2015, rehabbed Brown Line cars began appearing in service.

Retirement
If the options get picked up, the 3200-series cars currently in service are expected to be replaced by the new 7000-series cars.

References

External links 

http://www.chicagotribune.com/news/local/breaking/ct-cta-rail-car-rehab-met-0212-20150211-story.html

Chicago "L" rolling stock
Train-related introductions in 1992
Morrison-Knudsen multiple units